The US Capitol Bicentennial silver dollar is a commemorative coin issued by the United States Mint in 1994.

See also
 List of United States commemorative coins and medals (1990s)
 United States commemorative coins
 United States Congress Bicentennial commemorative coins

References

1994 establishments in the United States
Eagles on coins
Modern United States commemorative coins
United States Capitol